Axis of evil is a term used by George W. Bush to describe governments that he accused of sponsoring terrorism and seeking weapons of mass destruction.

Axis of evil may also refer to:

Cosmology 
 Axis of evil (cosmology), an anomaly in the temperature distribution of the cosmic microwave background radiation

Media and entertainment 
 Axis of Evil (album), a 2003 album by Suicide Commando
 Axis of Evil (film), a 2004 French film
 Axis of Evil Comedy Tour, a 2005-2007 stand-up comedy tour featuring Middle-Eastern comedians
 Behind Enemy Lines II: Axis of Evil, a 2006 war film
 "Axis of Evil", the 2010 two-part finale of Season 1 of the TV show Hot Wheels Battle Force 5
 Puppet Master: Axis of Evil, a 2010 horror film

See also
 "Axes of Evil", a song by 3 Inches of Blood on their album Advance and Vanquish
 Axis (disambiguation)